Christian Hochbruck (born 1 August 1989) is a German lightweight rower. He won a gold medal at the 2012 World Rowing Championships in Plovdiv with the lightweight men's eight.

References

1989 births
Living people
German male rowers
World Rowing Championships medalists for Germany